Ulrich Ensingen (or Ensinger) (1350/60 – February 10, 1419) was a medieval German architect.  He conceived the plans for the main spire of the Ulm Minster (the tallest church tower in existence) and was among the architects of Strasbourg Cathedral.

References

External links
Catholic Encyclopedia Article

German architects
14th-century births
1419 deaths
Year of birth uncertain